Mortier  is a surname. Notable people with the surname include: 

 Édouard Mortier, Duke of Trévise (1768–1835), French general
 Erwin Mortier (born 1965), Belgian author
 Gerard Mortier (1943–2014), Belgian opera director
 Gilberte Mortier (1907–1991), French freestyle swimmer
 Hans Mortier (1924–2010), Dutch professional wrestler
 Marc Mortier (1948–2004), CEO of Flanders Expo from 1986 to 2002
 Michel Mortier (1925–2015), French furniture designer, interior designer and architect
 Pieter Mortier (1661–1711), 18th-century mapmaker and engraver from the Northern Netherlands
 Roland Mortier (1920–2015), Belgian scientist